The Farewell Tour was a concert tour performed by the American rock band Kiss. It started on March 11, 2000 and concluded on April 13, 2001. It was the last tour to feature original member Ace Frehley.

Background 
It was intended to be Kiss' last tour, however, in late 2002 they announced that they were not going to retire as planned. Although Kiss continued performing after the conclusion of the tour, this was the final tour with the original, reunited  lineup. Paul Stanley later revealed the tour was an attempt to "put Kiss out of its misery" following the legal troubles during production of Psycho Circus, and the reunited band having underwhelming live performances and "being virtually prisoners to doing the same songs every tour." The tour began on March 11, 2000 in Phoenix, Arizona at the Blockbuster Desert Sky Pavilion.

During the show in Irvine, California, Frehley had missed his flight and ended up having to fly via helicopter to the show, where the band's manager Tommy Thayer was dressed in his makeup, ready to fill in for him.

Peter Criss had effectively left the band following the final show in North Charleston, in October 2000; however, this was not publicly known at the time. His reunion contract had essentially expired and he and Kiss were unable to come to terms for him continuing with the band, resulting in Criss destroying his drum set out of frustration at the end of the show. He was replaced by Eric Singer for the Japan and Australian legs. Frehley left the band following the farewell tour, intending to focus on his solo career.

In the tour program for the band's final tour, Stanley reflected on the tour:

Setlist

North American setlist
 "Detroit Rock City"
 "Deuce"
 "Shout It Out Loud"
 "I Love It Loud"
 "Shock Me"
 "Firehouse"
 "Do You Love Me"
 "Calling Dr. Love"
 "Heaven's on Fire"
 "Let Me Go, Rock 'n' Roll"
 "2,000 Man"
 "Psycho Circus"
 "Lick It Up"
 "God of Thunder"
 "Cold Gin"
 "100,000 Years"
 "Love Gun"
 "I Still Love You" (performed by Paul Stanley)
 "Black Diamond"
Encore
 "Beth"
 "Rock and Roll All Nite"

Japanese and Australian setlist
 "Detroit Rock City"
 "Deuce"
 "Shout It Out Loud"
 "Talk to Me"
 "I Love It Loud"
 "Firehouse"
 "Do You Love Me"
 "Calling Dr. Love"
 "Heaven's on Fire"
 "Let Me Go, Rock 'n' Roll"
 "Shock Me"
 "Psycho Circus"
 "Lick It Up"
 "God of Thunder"
 "Cold Gin"
 "100,000 Years"
 "Love Gun"
 "I Still Love You" (performed by Paul Stanley)
 "Black Diamond"
Encore
 "I Was Made for Lovin' You"
 "Rock and Roll All Nite"

Tour dates 

 The band rehearsed at this venue several days before their debut show.
 This show was troubled by major production errors. During the opening to the song "Love Gun" each night, Paul Stanley would ride on wire with foot sling to a small second stage in the arena floor where he performed the song. At this show, he became stalled a few rows out from the main stage and hung over the audience, helpless for quite a while before the road crew were able to reverse the wire and edge him back to the main stage. Many other errors occurred as well.
 Ace Frehley was so late arriving to this show, the band was preparing to dress up Tommy Thayer to fill in. Frehley traveled by helicopter to make it.
 The band and manager Doc McGhee presented Gene Simmons with a surprise, a giant birthday cake in the shape of a woman's breasts. He turned 51 that day.
 Peter Criss had added a tear to his facepaint to signal his dissatisfaction with the band. He left the stage before the band took its group bow, so only Stanley, Simmons and Frehley joined hands and bowed.
 After failed contract negotiations over what he was being paid, Criss destroyed his drum kit at the show's conclusion in frustration, Criss' last show with Kiss until 2003.
 Eric Singer's first show, after a five-year absence. Donned Catman makeup and outfit for the very first time.
 Ace Frehley's last show.

Postponed and cancelled dates

Box office score data

Personnel 
 Paul Stanley – vocals, rhythm guitar
 Gene Simmons – vocals, bass
 Peter Criss – drums, vocals (North American legs)
 Ace Frehley – lead guitar, vocals
Additional musician
 Eric Singer – drums, vocals (Japan and Australia legs)

References

Sources 

Kiss (band) concert tours
2000 concert tours
2001 concert tours
Farewell concert tours